The Israel Defense Forces 80th "Edom" Division (Territorial), is subordinate to the Southern Regional Command.

History 
The unit was established in 1979. On February 28, 2007 a regional division, Sagi Brigade, was established. On June 2, 2011, an additional regional division, Arava Brigade, was established, however it was closed in June 2016. In December 2012, the Eilat Brigade was renamed into the Yoav Brigade, and the new unit was tasked with protecting the Red Sea resort town of Eilat  . In November 2018, Paran Brigade replaced the Sagi Brigade, taking on its responsibilities as well as others.

Units 

 80th "Edom" (Territorial) Division
 406th "Yoav" (Territorial) Brigade (former "Eilat" Territorial Brigade)
 460th "Bnei Or"/"Sons of Light" (Training) Armor Brigade
 512th "Sagi" (Territorial) Brigade (to be decommissioned)
 Paran (Territorial) Brigade
 1st "Cheetah" Unisex Light Infantry Battalion
 33rd "Caracal" Unisex Light Infantry Battalion
 454th "Tabor" (Reserve) Artillery Regiment
 727th "Eitam" Field Intelligence Battalion
 681st Division Signal Battalion
 "Edom" Heavy Engineer Company
 "Rotem" (Reserve) Counterterrorism Unit

Commanders

References

Divisions of Israel
Southern Command (Israel)